Benito Cabrera Hernández (born 1963 in Venezuela) is a Canarian timple composer and virtuoso.

He was born in Venezuela. Although he moved to Lanzarote at a young age, he has spent most of his life in Tenerife. He moved to Tenerife to study psychology in University of La Laguna.

He is the author of the official hymn of the Autonomous Community of the Canary Islands, and the author of the song Nube de Hielo, "Ice Cloud", one of the most deeply rooted songs in the canaries.

Discography
 1991 Concierto de timple
 1992 Timple y orquesta, con la Orquesta Sinfónica de Tenerife
 1996 Notas de viaje
 2000 El color del tiempo
 2002 Travesías
 Puente del sur

Collaborations
Partial List:

 1999 Castillos de arena, de Taller Canario de Canción
 1999 Vamos a escuchar al viento, de la Orquesta Sinfónica de Tenerife
 2001 Teide y Nublo, de Los Sabandeños
 2001 Étnico, con José Manuel Ramos
 2001 Timples@2000, con José Antonio Ramos y Domingo Rodríguez Oramas "El Colorao"

External links
Official website 

Living people
1963 births
Musicians from the Canary Islands
People from Tenerife